Zajedno may refer to:
 Together (Zajedno), a political party in Serbia
 Together for Serbia (Zajedno za Srbiju), a defunct political party in Serbia
 Together (coalition) (Zajedno), a defunct political alliance in Serbia